Okanagan was  a provincial electoral district in the Canadian province of British Columbia beginning with the election of 1903 and lasting only until the election of 1912, after which it was succeeded by North Okanagan and South Okanagan.  The riding was originally part of the Yale riding until 1890.  When that riding was first broken up the Okanagan was in Yale-East (1894–1900).

Notable MLAs

Political geography

Election results 
Note: Winners of each election are in bold.

|-

|Conservative
|Price Ellison
|align="right"|725
|align="right"|56.77%
|align="right"|
|align="right"|unknown

|Liberal
|Thomas Willing Stirling
|align="right"|552  
|align="right"|43.23%
|align="right"|
|align="right"|unknown
|- bgcolor="white"
!align="right" colspan=3|Total valid votes
!align="right"|1,277
!align="right"|100.00%
!align="right"|
|- bgcolor="white"
!align="right" colspan=3|Total rejected ballots
!align="right"|
!align="right"|
!align="right"|
|- bgcolor="white"
!align="right" colspan=3|Turnout
!align="right"|%
!align="right"|
!align="right"|
|}

|-

|Conservative
|Price Ellison
|align="right"|893
|align="right"|54.85%
|align="right"|
|align="right"|unknown

|Liberal
|Kenneth Cattanach MacDonald
|align="right"|643  
|align="right"|39.50%
|align="right"|
|align="right"|unknown
|- bgcolor="white"
!align="right" colspan=3|Total valid votes
!align="right"|1,628    
!align="right"|100.00%
!align="right"|
|- bgcolor="white"
!align="right" colspan=3|Total rejected ballots
!align="right"|
!align="right"|
!align="right"|
|- bgcolor="white"
!align="right" colspan=3|Turnout
!align="right"|%
!align="right"|
!align="right"|
|}

|-

|Liberal
|Francis Richard Edwin DeHart
|align="right"|741  
|align="right"|30.04%
|align="right"|
|align="right"|unknown

|Conservative
|Price Ellison
|align="right"|1,538
|align="right"|62.34%
|align="right"|
|align="right"|unknown

|- bgcolor="white"
!align="right" colspan=3|Total valid votes
!align="right"|2,467 
!align="right"|100.00%
!align="right"|
|- bgcolor="white"
!align="right" colspan=3|Total rejected ballots
!align="right"|
!align="right"|
!align="right"|
|- bgcolor="white"
!align="right" colspan=3|Turnout
!align="right"|%
!align="right"|
!align="right"|
|}          

|-

|Conservative
|Price Ellison
|align="right"|1,388
|align="right"|82.37%
|align="right"|
|align="right"|unknown

|- bgcolor="white"
!align="right" colspan=3|Total valid votes
!align="right"|1,685  
!align="right"|100.00%
!align="right"|
|- bgcolor="white"
!align="right" colspan=3|Total rejected ballots
!align="right"|
!align="right"|
!align="right"|
|- bgcolor="white"
!align="right" colspan=3|Turnout
!align="right"|%
!align="right"|
!align="right"|
|}

Redistribution of the riding following the 1912 election and two new ridings, North Okanagan and South Okanagan first appeared in the election of 1916.

Sources

Elections BC website - historical election data

Former provincial electoral districts of British Columbia